T.G.I.S. is a Philippine television drama series broadcast by GMA Network. Directed by Mark A. Reyes and later Dominic Zapata, it stars Bobby Andrews, Angelu de Leon, Onemig Bondoc, Michael Flores, Raven Villanueva, Red Sternberg, Dingdong Dantes, Antoinette Taus, Sunshine Dizon and Anne Curtis. It premiered on August 12, 1995, on the network's Saturday line up. The series concluded on November 27, 1999, with a total of 233 episodes.

The series is streaming online on YouTube. A film, T.G.I.S.: The Movie was released on January 4, 1997, by Viva Films and GMA Films.

Cast and characters

 Angelu de Leon as Ma. Patrice "Peachy" Real
 Bobby Andrews as Joaquin "Wacks" Torres III
 Michael Flores as Miguel "Mickey" Ledesma
 Red Sternberg as Francisco Martin "Kiko" Arboleda De Dios
 Raven Villanueva as Cristina "Cris" De Guzman
 Maybelyn dela Cruz as Maruja
 Lester Llansang as Casper
 Bernadette Perez as Beatrice "Bea" Santillan
 Idelle Martinez as Samantha Real
 Kim Delos Santos as Tere Gonzaga
 Chico Ventosa as Gabby Torres
 Onemig Bondoc as Jose Mari "JM" Rodriguez
 Rica Peralejo as Michelle "Mitch" Ferrer
 Ciara Sotto as Regina "Rain" Abrera
 Dingdong Dantes as Iñaki Torres
 Antoinette Taus as Bianca de Jesus
 Chantal Umali as Happy
 Kenneth Cajucom as Marciano "Marci" Macatangay
 Chubi del Rosario as Reyster
 Anne Curtis as Emily "Em"
 Polo Ravales as Inocencio "Ice" Martinez
 Sunshine Dizon as Carla "Calai" Escalante
 Dino Guevarra as David
 Ardie Aquino as Benjo 
 Jam Melendez as Jag
 Jason Aguilar as Bullet
 Mark Stefens as Zyron
 Aiza Marquez as Billie
 Vanna Garcia
 Maui Taylor
 Jake Roxas as Noel Sta. Maria

Production 
T.G.I.S. was first directed by Mark A. Reyes with story by Kit Villanueva-Langit. The title of the show was conceptualized by Reyes to mean "Thank God It's Sabado," which was derived from commercials of Jollibee ("I Love You Sabado") and San Miguel Beer (Sabado Nights), and the expression "Thank God It's Friday," replacing the Friday with Sabado (the Tagalog word for Saturday).

Soundtrack 
The opening theme of the show was originally "Dyslexic Heart" by Paul Westerberg that was taken from the Singles film but it was later changed to "Walking on Sunshine" by Katrina and the Waves.

Accolades

References

External links
 

1995 Philippine television series debuts
1999 Philippine television series endings
Filipino-language television shows
GMA Network drama series
Philippine teen drama television series
Television series by Viva Television
Television shows set in Manila